The Outback Challenge is an off-roading event that takes place in the sheep stations surrounding Broken Hill, New South Wales, Australia. It is an amateur event where competitors in specially built four-wheel drives compete in a number of trials which address all aspects of off-roading, including navigation, vehicular recovery, vehicle maintenance and bush survival as well as off-road driving skills.

The first Challenge started in 1999, and has attracted competitors from all over Australia and overseas with competitors from New Zealand, Malaysia, United States, Great Britain, France and the Canary Islands taking part. The event was discontinued in 2011 and replaced by Australian Outback 4x4 Extreme, but was discontinued after its first year. The event will return in 2014 under new management in October, away from its traditional May date.

Winners

References

External links
 Official website

Off-roading
Off-road vehicles
Off-road racing
Auto races in Australia
Recurring sporting events established in 1999
Australian outback
1999 establishments in Australia